Pierre-Hugues Herbert and Nicolas Mahut defeated Reilly Opelka and John Peers in the final, 6–4, 7–5, to win the doubles tennis title at the 2021 Queen's Club Championships. It was the duo's third title at the tournament. Opelka and Peers were contesting as a new pairing in their first final.

Feliciano López and Andy Murray were the defending champions from when the event was last held in 2019, but Murray did not return to compete. López played alongside Jannik Sinner, but they lost in the second round to Nikola Mektić and Mate Pavić.

Seeds

Draw

Finals

Top half

Bottom half

References

External links
 Main draw

Queen's Club Championships - Doubles
Doubles